The National Resistance Government of Mozambique was in place from the start of the civil war against the central government of Mozambique in 1975 until an accord was reached with the government on 9 October 1992.

Affiliations
The incumbents held affiliations with the conservative political group in Mozambique.  This group, the Mozambican National Resistance, was named Resistencia Nacional Moçambicana (MNR) from 1975 to 1978.  After 1978, this changed to Resistencia Nacional Moçambicana (RENAMO).

Timeline
The following shows each incumbent of the National Resistance Government of Mozambique, the term year, their political affiliation, and additional notes.  Dates given in italics indicate de facto continuation of office.

History of Mozambique
Military history of Mozambique
Government of Mozambique
Mozambican Civil War